Filippo Bigioli (San Severino Marche, June 4, 1798 - 1878) was an Italian painter, active in a late neoclassical style

Biography
In 1861, he painted a series of over two dozen large canvases for a Galleria Dantesca about Dante and his works, most of which were exhibited initially in the Palazzo Altieri in Rome, but later when on tour, including to London. He was helped in the planning by Romualdo Gentilucci, and coloring by Vincenzo Paliotti, Guerra, and professor Alfonso Chierici. He helped fresco the palace (destroyed) and villa of Count Torlonia in Rome. A collection of his works is on display in the Palazzo Comunale of San Severino.

References

19th-century Italian painters
Italian male painters
1798 births
1878 deaths
Italian neoclassical painters
19th-century Italian male artists